The Great Dome Robbery is a 2002 crime drama film directed by Gabriel Range, based on the actual Millennium Dome raid of 2000.

Plot 
A group of international jewel thieves is planning to steal the world's largest diamond from its show display at the Millennium Dome, unaware that they have been under police surveillance from the moment they had begun planning their caper.

Cast 

 Craig Fairbrass as Ray Betson
 George Innes as Terry Millman
 Gerard Monaco as Aido Ciarrocchi
 Martin Herdman as John Swinfield
 Keith Lancaster as Alex Bartlett
 Jonathan Linsley as James Hurley
 Iain McKee as Guy
 Alan Ford as Narrator
 Terry Bird as Will Cockram
 Justin Salinger as Lee Wenham
 Carl Rigg as Jon Shatford
 Sean Carlsen as Kevin Meredith
 Mark Christopher Collins as Police Officer
 Anthony Travis as Police Officer
 Jason Daly as Police Officer Kevin Richards
 Jane Frampton as Car Crash Victim
 Chris MacDonnell as D.C. Chris Miller

Reception

References

External links 
 

2002 films
2002 crime drama films
2000s heist films
British crime drama films
British heist films
2000s English-language films
2000s British films